Welch Island is an island,  long with a prominent pinnacle rock of , lying north of the Rouse Islands and  off the eastern side of Holme Bay in Mac. Robertson Land, Antarctica.

Discovery and naming
Welch Island was discovered in February 1931 by the British Australian and New Zealand Antarctic Research Expedition (BANZARE) under Sir Douglas Mawson, who named it for B. F. Welch, Second Engineer on the RRS Discovery.

Important Bird Area
A 415 ha site comprising Welch Island, neighbouring Klung Island, and the intervening smaller islands and marine area, has been designated an Important Bird Area (IBA) by BirdLife International because it supports about 36,000 breeding pairs of Adélie penguins, based on 2012 satellite imagery. Snow petrels breed on high ground on the islands. The islands are mostly ice-free in summer and several lakes are present.

See also 
 Composite Antarctic Gazetteer
 List of Antarctic islands south of 60° S
 SCAR
 Territorial claims in Antarctica
 Møller Bank

References

Important Bird Areas of Antarctica
Penguin colonies
Islands of Mac. Robertson Land